£100 Reward is a 1908 British short silent film directed by James Williamson.

Plot
A poor family, suffering from a lack of food, plan to sell their dog to gain some extra income. Before they act on their plan, the dog discovers some buried jewels. These turn out to be stolen, and the family are given a £100 reward.

References

External links

1908 films
Films directed by James Williamson (film pioneer)
British silent short films
British black-and-white films
British drama short films
1908 drama films
Silent drama films